Castle View Enterprise Academy (Formerly Castle View School) is a Sponsored Academy in Sunderland, England.

History
Castle View School was officially opened in 1960 and extended in 1972. The extensive site is situated to the north west of Sunderland and is bounded by the Hylton Dene and within sight of the historic Hylton Castle. The urban catchment area incorporates the former mining village of Castletown and the post war housing estates of Hylton Castle and Town End Farm.

In 2009 it became one of the original 200 sponsored academies in England.  These were the most challenging schools in the country with a history of poor educational performance. Taken out of local authority control it is now sponsored by Northumbrian Water Limited. During the conversion it changed its name to Castle View Enterprise Academy.  The academy opened in 2009 in £17 million new buildings on the site of its predecessor school.

School characteristics

The school is in an area with significant social and economic deprivation, and free school meals eligibility stands presently at around 48%.

The principal of the school is Janet Bridges, who received an OBE in the 2013 New Years Honours list for her services to education.

The academy has been successful in a joint bid to build a 4G FIFA international standard artificial football pitch.  The pitch will be ready for September and used by both school and the local community.  They will shortly be launching the Castle View Football Academy in partnership with SAFC (Sunderland Football Club) to run alongside the Cricket Academy already working with qualified coaches and Durham County Cricket Club.

The academy is currently rated as "Good" by OFSTED (Jan 2012); its results have passed national averages, making it one of the highest performing schools in the City of Sunderland and the North East.  In 2009 the predecessor school closed on 26% 5A-C. The results since have increased each year: 2010 = 43%; 2011 = 54%; 2012 = 67%; 2013 = 68%.  This rapid rise was recognised in 2014 with an award from the SSAT (Specialist Schools and Academies Trust) for most improved academy.

Learning Resource Centre
CVEA has a Learning Resource Centre (LRC) run by the library and resources manager.

References

External links
Castle View Enterprise Academy homepage

Academies in the City of Sunderland
Secondary schools in the City of Sunderland